Enderson is a given name. It may refer to:

 Enderson Moreira (born 1971), Brazilian football manager
 Enderson George (born 1982), Saint Lucian football midfielder
 Enderson (footballer) (born 1988), Enderson Norgentern de Oliveira, Brazilian football goalkeeper
 Enderson Franco (born 1992), Venezuelan baseball player